Tânia Maria Pereira Ribeiro (born 10 March 1974), commonly known as Tânia Maria, Tânia Maranhão or simply Tânia, is a Brazilian former footballer. She played as a defender for Brazil's Saad EC, and is a member of the Brazilian National Team, for which she won a silver medal at the 2004 and 2008 Summer Olympics. She started on futsal team Eurosport, and also played for EC Bahia, Santa Isabel and Rayo Vallecano. In 1997 Tânia was playing for São Paulo FC.

She was born in São Luís, Maranhão.

References

1974 births
Living people
Tania
Tania
People from São Luís, Maranhão
Tania
Tania
Tania
Tania
Footballers at the 2011 Pan American Games
Tania
Tania
Tania
Tania
Tania
Tania
Olympic medalists in football
Footballers at the 2012 Summer Olympics
Medalists at the 2008 Summer Olympics
Medalists at the 2004 Summer Olympics
Expatriate women's footballers in Spain
Brazilian expatriate sportspeople in Spain
Rayo Vallecano Femenino players
Primera División (women) players
Brazil women's international footballers
Brazilian expatriate women's footballers
Pan American Games gold medalists for Brazil
Pan American Games silver medalists for Brazil
Pan American Games medalists in football
Saad Esporte Clube (women) players
Medalists at the 2011 Pan American Games
São Paulo FC (women) players
Sportspeople from Maranhão